Distress (French: Désarroi) is a 1946 French drama film directed by Robert-Paul Dagan and starring Jules Berry, Jean Mercanton and Gabrielle Dorziat.

Cast
 Thérèse Aspar 
 Jules Berry as Frontenac  
 Suzy Carrier 
 Léonce Corne as Simonin  
 Jean Debucourt as Clermont-Latour  
 Gabrielle Dorziat as Mme Meillan  
 Jean Mercanton as Pierre  
 Valentine Tessier 
 Tramel as Carrière

References

Bibliography 
 Goble, Alan. The Complete Index to Literary Sources in Film. Walter de Gruyter, 1999.

External links 
 

1946 films
1946 drama films
French drama films
1940s French-language films
French films based on plays
Films based on works by Victorien Sardou
French black-and-white films
1940s French films